Teddy "The Pride Of Poplar" Baldock (24 May 1907 — 8 March 1971) born in Poplar, London was an English professional bantam/feather/lightweight boxer of the 1920s and 1930s who won the National Sporting Club (NSC) (subsequently known as the British Boxing Board of Control (BBBofC)) British bantamweight title, British Empire bantamweight title, and World Bantamweight Title (British version), his professional fighting weight varied from , i.e. flyweight to , i.e. featherweight, he was managed by Joe Morris, and Ted Broadribb.

Genealogical information
Teddy Baldock's marriage to Mary C. (née McRae) was registered during January→March 1931 in Poplar district, they had children; Pamela M. McRae (birth registered October→December 1936 in East Ham district).

References

External links

Image - Teddy Baldock
Website - Teddy Baldock ~ The Pride Of Poplar

1907 births
1971 deaths
Bantamweight boxers
English male boxers
Featherweight boxers
Lightweight boxers
People from Poplar, London
Boxers from Greater London